Farsta is a borough (stadsdelsområde) of Söderort in the southern part of Stockholm Municipality, Sweden.

Overview
The districts that make up the borough are Fagersjö, Farsta, Farsta strand, Farstanäset, Gubbängen, Hökarängen, Larsboda, Sköndal, Svedmyra and Tallkrogen. The population  is 45,463 on an area of 15.40 km2, which gives a density of 2,952.14/km2.

References

External links

Boroughs of Stockholm